Nyong-et-So'o is a department of Centre Province in Cameroon. The department covers an area of 3,581 km and as of 2001 had a total population of 142,907. The capital of the department lies at Mbalmayo.

Subdivisions
The department is divided administratively into 6 communes and in turn into villages.

Communes 
 Akoeman
 Dzeng
 Mbalmayo 
 Mengueme
 Ngomedzap
 Nkolmetet

References

Departments of Cameroon
Centre Region (Cameroon)